The Edinburgh Handedness Inventory is a measurement scale used to assess the dominance of a person's right or left hand in everyday activities, sometimes referred to as laterality. The inventory can be used by an observer assessing the person, or by a person self-reporting hand use. The latter method tends to be less reliable due to a person over-attributing tasks to the dominant hand.

The Edinburgh Handedness Inventory was published in 1971 by Richard Charles Oldfield and has been used in various scientific studies as well as popular literature.

See also
 Ambidexterity
 Cross-dominance
 Dextrocardia
 Footedness
 Handedness
 Laterality
 Ocular dominance
 Situs inversus

References

External links
 An online example of the tool authored by Mark Cohen, hosted at http://www.brainmapping.org

Motor skills
Upper limb anatomy
Handedness
Chirality